Étang de Brouquenat is a lake in Ariège, France.

Brouquenat
Occitanie region articles needing translation from French Wikipedia